The Westchester County Democratic Committee is the affiliate of the Democratic Party in the state of New York. Its headquarters is in White Plains, New York.

Current elected officials 
The following is a list of elected statewide and federal Democratic officeholders:

Members of Congress 
Democrats hold all 3 of Westchester County's seats in the U.S. House of Representatives and both U.S. Senate seats.

U.S. Senate 
Democrats have controlled both of New York's seats in the U.S. Senate since 1998:

 Class I: Kirsten Gillibrand (Junior Senator) Junior Senator Gillibrand
 Class III: Chuck Schumer (Senior Senator, Senate Majority Leader, Chairman of Senate Democratic Policy Committee) Senior Senator Schumer

U.S. House of Representatives 

 NY-16: Jamaal Bowman
 NY-17: Mondaire Jones
 NY-18: Sean Patrick Maloney

Countywide officials 
Democrats control all four of the elected countywide offices:

 County Executive: George Latimer
 Deputy County Executive: Kenneth Jenkins
 District Attorney: Mimi Rocah
 County Clerk: Tim Idoni

State Senators 

 SD-34: Alessandra Biaggi
 SD-35: Andrea Stewart-Cousins
 SD-36: Jamaal Bailey
 SD-37: Shelley Mayer
 SD-38: Elijah Reichlin-Melnick
SD-40: Pete Harkham

State Assembly Members 

 AD-88: Amy Paulin
 AD-89: J. Gary Pretlow
 AD-90: Nader Sayegh
 AD-91: Steven Otis
 AD-92: Thomas J. Abinati
 AD-93: Chris Burdick
 AD-95: Sandy Galef

Mayoral offices 
All of the county's major cities have Democratic mayors.

 Yonkers (1): Mike Spano
 New Rochelle (2): Noam Bramson
 Mount Vernon (3): Shawyn Patterson Howard
 White Plains (4): Tom Roach

References

External links 

 Westchester Young Democrats
 Hudson Valley Stonewall Democrats
 Black Democrats of Westchester 
 Hispanic Democrats of Westchester
 Women Democrats of Westchester

Westchester County, New York
New York State Democratic Committee